Darren Derochie (born 1 January 1966) is a Canadian former cross-country skier who competed in the 1992 Winter Olympics.

References

1966 births
Living people
Canadian male cross-country skiers
Olympic cross-country skiers of Canada
Cross-country skiers at the 1992 Winter Olympics